Hillsdale is an unincorporated community located within Colts Neck and Marlboro townships in Monmouth County, New Jersey, United States. The community is located at the intersection of County Route 520 which runs east and west, Conover Road which heads north, and Boundary Road which heads south. The southeastern quadrant of this intersection is a part of Colts Neck while the other three are in Marlboro. The community is located atop a small hill and is largely rural. The Colts Neck quadrant is made up of a housing development while the Marlboro side is mostly forests, parkland, and the remains of the Marlboro Psychiatric Hospital.

References

Colts Neck Township, New Jersey
Marlboro Township, New Jersey
Unincorporated communities in Monmouth County, New Jersey
Unincorporated communities in New Jersey